Capps Creek is a stream in Ripley County, in the U.S. state of Missouri. It is a tributary of the Current River.

The confluence is about seven miles northwest of Doniphan.

Capps Creek has the name of Nimrod Capps, an early settler.

See also
List of rivers of Missouri

References

Rivers of Ripley County, Missouri
Rivers of Missouri
Tributaries of the Current River (Ozarks)